The Levant Times and Shipping Gazette was a daily newspaper published in Constantinople (now Istanbul), Ottoman Empire, in both English and French. J. Laffan Hanly was the editor. It was established in 1868. In addition, to the newspaper published in Turkey, by 1869 it also had a bi-weekly edition distributed in the United Kingdom. Its offices were at Ipsıck Khau, Perchembé Bazaar, in Galata.

Bradshaw's Continental Railway, Steam Transit, and General Guide, for Travellers Through Europe stated that its circulation was "very large".

See also

 Media in the Ottoman Empire

References

External links
 Selected issues of The Levant Times and Shipping Gazette at the National Library of France
Newspapers published in Istanbul
Ottoman Empire
1868 establishments in the Ottoman Empire